Aphex may refer to:

 Aphex Systems, a maker of audio processing equipment
 Aphex Twin, a British electronic music artist

See also 
 Apex (disambiguation)